James Whitney Bettes (October 17, 1848 – November 29, 1925) was an Ontario merchant and political figure. He represented Muskoka and Parry Sound in the Legislative Assembly of Ontario as a Liberal member from 1882 to 1883.

He was born in Prince Albert, Ontario County, Canada West in 1848, the son of John Bettes. In 1872, Bettes married Martha Maria Crosby, a granddaughter of John Willson. He served on the council for Uxbridge. He was elected to the provincial assembly in an 1882 by-election held after John Classon Miller resigned to run unsuccessfully for a seat in the House of Commons.

He died in 1925 at Dauphin, Manitoba.

References

External links
The Canadian parliamentary companion, 1883 JA Gemmill

1848 births
1925 deaths
Ontario Liberal Party MPPs
People from Uxbridge, Ontario